The Jinan dialect is a Mandarin Chinese dialect spoken in Jinan in Shandong province, China. It is a variety of Jilu Mandarin.

Phonetics and phonology

Consonants

Tones

See also
 Varieties of Chinese

References

Běijīng dàxué Zhōngguó yǔyán wénxuéxì yǔyánxué jiàoyánshì. (1989). Hànyǔ fāngyīn zìhuì. Běijīng: Wénzì gǎigé chūbǎnshè. (北京大學中國語言文學系語言學教研室. 1989. 漢語方音字匯. 北京: 文字改革出版社)
Norman, Jerry. [1988] (2002). Chinese. Cambridge: CUP 
Yuán, Jiāhuá. (1989). Hànyǔ fāngyán gàiyào (An introduction to Chinese dialects). Beijing: Wénzì gǎigé chūbǎnshè. (袁家驊. 1989. 漢語方言概要. 北京:文字改革出版社.)

External links
 Cantonese and other dialects (in Chinese)
 Classification of Jilu Dialects from Glossika

Mandarin Chinese
Jinan